Billbergia zebrina is a species of flowering plant in the genus Billbergia. This species is native to Brazil, Argentina, Uruguay, and Paraguay.

Cultivars
 Billbergia 'Ambiorix'
Billbergia 'Astro Pink'
 Billbergia 'Astronaut'
 Billbergia 'Bam'
 Billbergia 'Charles Dewey'
 Billbergia 'Dancing Waters'
 Billbergia 'E. Thomas Witte'
 Billbergia 'El Capitan'
 Billbergia 'Ellen Jordan Stewart'
 Billbergia 'Evelyn Metz'
 Billbergia 'Full of Life'
 Billbergia 'Jubilee'
 Billbergia 'Lucas Coelho'
 Billbergia 'Ribbons & Lace'
 Billbergia 'Strange Magic'
 Billbergia 'Xmas Bells'
 Billbergia 'Xmas Cheer'
 × Billmea 'Curlylocks'

References

zebrina
Flora of South America
Plants described in 1826